Gregor Lagner was a Slovenian politician of the early 16th century. He became mayor of Ljubljana in 1505.
He was succeeded by Lenart Praunsperger in 1506.

References 

Year of birth missing
16th-century Slovenian people
Mayors of Ljubljana
Year of death missing